Calliostoma cheni is a species of sea snail, a marine gastropod mollusk in the family Calliostomatidae.

Some authors place this taxon in the subgenus Calliostoma (Fautor)

Description

Distribution

References

 Dong Z. Z. (2002) Fauna Sinica Invertebrata, vol. 29. Science Press, Beijing. 210 pp.

External links

cheni
Gastropods described in 2002